Aliminusa (Sicilian: Larminusa) is a comune (municipality) in the Metropolitan City of Palermo in the Sicily region, Southern Italy, located about  southeast of Palermo.

Aliminusa borders the following municipalities: Caccamo, Cerda, Montemaggiore Belsito, Sciara, Sclafani Bagni.

References

Municipalities of the Metropolitan City of Palermo